Héctor Alvarez (born 21 December 1946) is a Mexican wrestler. He competed in the men's Greco-Roman 87 kg at the 1968 Summer Olympics.

References

External links
 

1946 births
Living people
Mexican male sport wrestlers
Olympic wrestlers of Mexico
Wrestlers at the 1968 Summer Olympics
Sportspeople from Michoacán